François Châtelet (11 September 1912 – 19 April 1987, age 75) was a mathematician at the Université de Besançon who introduced the Weil–Châtelet group and Châtelet surfaces. His father was the mathematician Albert Châtelet.

References 

1987 deaths
1912 births
20th-century French mathematicians
Academic staff of the University of Franche-Comté
Algebraic geometers